Tarraleah is a rural locality in the local government area (LGA) of Central Highlands in the Central LGA region of Tasmania. The 2016 census has a population of nil for the state suburb of Tarraleah.

The small town is 126 km north-west of the state capital Hobart, and slightly closer to Queenstown.

History 
Tarraleah was gazetted as a locality in 1971.
 
The township was built in the 1930s by the Hydro Electric Commission to house Tasmania's pioneering hydro electricity officers and management.

Nive Road Post Office opened in 1934 and was renamed Tarraleah in 1935.

Geography
The Derwent River flows through from west to south, where it forms part of the southern boundary. Lake Binney is contained within the locality, as is Tarraleah Power Station.

Road infrastructure
Route A10 (Lyell Highway) passes through from south-east to north. Route C601 (Fourteen Mile Road) starts at an intersection with A10 and runs north-west until it exits.

Amenities
The area is noted for its alpine lakes and mountains, and many hydro-electric dams, canals and giant steel pipeways. 
Tarraleah is located along the Lyell Highway, and is only a short distance from both Lake King William and Bronte Lagoon. Lake Lipootah and Bradys Lake are also close by.

After a multimillion-dollar redevelopment, the former Hydro construction village has become an estate that comprises Tarraleah Lodge with accommodation, recreation, and dining options. Fresh water trout fishing, boating, bushwalking, mountain biking and kayaking are all popular activities in and around the township.

Tarraleah is also home to a high altitude golf course.

References

Towns in Tasmania
Central Highlands (Tasmania)
Localities of Central Highlands Council